Rebel-Revive is the third and most recent studio album by American post-hardcore band Jamie's Elsewhere. The album was self-released on April 8, 2014.

Track listing

Personnel
Jamie's Elsewhere
 Justin Kyle – lead vocals
 Matt Scarpelli – lead and rhythm guitars
 Chance Medeiros – bass
 Mike Spearman – keyboards, synthesizer, backing vocals
 Zach Wasmundt – drums

Additional musicians
 Nick Sampson – production, additional guitars on track 8
 Garret Rapp (The Color Morale) – additional vocals on track 1
 Tyler Carter (Issues) – additional vocals on track 3
 Dev – additional vocals on track 6
 Phil Druyor (I Am Abomination) – additional vocals on track 8

References

2014 albums
Self-released albums
Jamie's Elsewhere albums